FH, Fh, or fh may refer to:

Businesses and institutions
 Danish Trade Union Confederation
 Faculty of Humanities (The Hong Kong Polytechnic University)
 Fachhochschule, in German, a college of higher education
 Federation of the Swiss Watch Industry FH
 Futura International Airways (IATA code)

Science and technology

Biology and medicine
 Familial hypercholesterolemia, a genetic disorder
 Factor H, a complement control protein
 Family history
 FH, a gene that encodes the enzyme fumarase

Chemistry
 Ferrihydrite (Fh), a widespread hydrous ferric oxyhydroxide mineral

Other uses in science and technology
 McDonnell FH Phantom, the U.S. Navy's first jet-powered fighter aircraft
 Falcon Heavy, Spacex's heavy lift reusable rocket

Sport
 Fimleikafélag Hafnarfjarðar, Icelandic football club

Other uses
 fh (digraph); appears in Irish and some other languages
Volvo FH, a range of trucks